The 2010 WK League was the second season of the WK League, the South Korea's women's football league. The regular season began on 22 March 2010 and ended on 30 September 2010. Six clubs competed as a quadruple round-robin, for a total of 20 matches. Goyang Daekyo were the defending champions.

Teams

Table

Result

First half

Second half

All-Stars Match
 Central: Hyundai Steel Redangels (Incheon), Seoul Amazones (Seoul), Suwon Facilities Management Corporation (Suwon)
 South: Busan Sangmu (Busan), Chungnam Ilhwa Chunma (Chungnam), Daekyo Kangaroos (Goyang)

Championship

Championship final
1st leg

2nd leg

Suwon FMC won 2–1 on aggregate.

References

women.soccerway.com – 2010 WK-League season

2009
2010 in South Korean football
South Korea
South Korea